Surescripts is an Arlington, Virginia-based information technology company that supports e-prescription, the electronic transmission of prescriptions between health care organizations and pharmacies, as well as general health information exchange (HIE) of medical records.

History
Under the Medicare Prescription Drug, Improvement, and Modernization Act of 2003, Surescripts took part in a pilot program with the Centers for Medicare & Medicaid Services (CMS) to employ the SCRIPT standard. In 2008, Surescripts merged with RxHub which was formed by a consortium of pharmacy benefit management companies comprising CVS Caremark, Express Scripts and Medco Health Solutions.  According to the U.S. Department of Health and Human Services, in 2014 96% of U.S. community pharmacies and 70% of U.S. physicians used Surescripts' e-prescription network.

In June 2022, Surescripts announced Frank Harvey as its new CEO.

References

External links
Official website

Health care companies based in Virginia